Celebrate the Day is a single by Herbert Grönemeyer featuring duo Amadou et Mariam that was served as the official anthem of the 2006 FIFA World Cup held in Germany. Next to English version, Grönemeyer also recorded a German-language version called Zeit, dass sich was dreht (in Germany, Switzerland, Liechtenstein, Austria and Italy (Trentino-Alto Adige/Südtirol); English translation: Time that something spins) with a slightly different text and meaning. The song appears on the CD Zeit, dass sich was dreht.

The song was a number-one-hit in Germany during the World Cup and also placed second in the Austrian charts.

References

2006 singles
FIFA World Cup official songs and anthems
Sony BMG singles